The Southern Alberta Institute of Technology  (SAIT) is a polytechnic institute in Calgary, Alberta, Canada. SAIT offers more than 110 career programs in technology, trades and business. Established in 1916, it is Calgary's second oldest post-secondary institution and Canada's first publicly funded technical institute.

Campus location and expansion
SAIT's main campus is located on 16 Avenue NW, overlooking the downtown core of Calgary and is served by the CTrain light rail system. SAIT has three other campuses located in Calgary:
 Mayland Heights – Located on Centre Avenue, this facility supports students pursuing a career in auto body, crane and hoisting, recreation vehicle servicing, electrical, plumbing and rail.
 Culinary Campus – Located on Stephen Avenue, it provides baking basics and cooking fundamentals. The Culinary Campus also acts as a marketplace, selling food to the general public.
 Art Smith Aero Centre – Occupying  of land at the Calgary International Airport, this campus supports the School of Transportation.
 Crane and Ironworker Facility – Located at 10490 72 St SE, this  facility has a fully functioning crane maintenance shop, a yard with boom trucks and mobile cranes and crane simulators.
 The Tastemarket by SAIT – Located at 444 7 Ave SW, The Tastemarket is a downtown urban eatery and learning environment.

Academics

SAIT offers three baccalaureate degrees (2019), three applied degrees, 86 diploma and certificate programs, 27 apprenticeship trades and more than 1,100 continuing education, corporate training, camps and other open registration courses.
SAIT delivers skill-oriented education through nine schools:

MacPhail School of Energy
School of Business
School of Construction
School of Health and Public Safety
School of Hospitality and Tourism
School of Information and Communications Technologies
School of Manufacturing and Automation
School of Transportation
School for Advanced Digital Technology

English language foundations and academic upgrading are offered through the Lamb Learner Success Centre. SAIT's Applied Research and Innovation Services (ARIS) department works in partnership with industry on applied research.

Facilities

Heritage Hall

Heritage Hall is one of the central buildings and a historical site on the SAIT campus.

Construction began on Heritage Hall on January 18, 1921, five years after the Provincial Institute of Technology and Art (PITA) was formed in Calgary in 1916. Designed by Alberta provincial architect Richard Palin Blakey and built by J. McDiarmid Company of Winnipeg, the three-storey modern structure's focal point is the central entrance flanked by two large towers designed with the characteristics of Collegiate Gothic architecture, which was prevalent throughout North America at the time. Despite the prevalence of Collegiate Gothic architecture in post-secondary education, Heritage Hall is the only example in Calgary. Heritage Hall was completed later in 1922 and accommodated both the PITA and the Calgary Normal School. During the Second World War, the structure was used as a wireless training school for the British Commonwealth Air Training Plan. The structure was intentionally situated on Calgary's North Hill to maximize the structure's visibility throughout Calgary, and also provide a view of the city from the building. The building was originally known as the "Provincial Institute of Technology Building and Normal School" and was renamed "Heritage Hall" in 1985.

On May 31, 1985, the Government of Alberta designated Heritage Hall a provincial historic resource under the Historical Resources Act. The citation for the historical designation notes the integral role the structure and SAIT played in the development of post-secondary education in Alberta, and the significant architectural value of the Collegiate Gothic design.

On June 24, 1987, the Government of Canada designated Heritage Hall a national historic site under the name "Heritage Hall Southern Alberta Institute of Technology National Historic Site of Canada". The federal designation notes the importance of the structure and SAIT as a place in the development of vocational education in Western Canada. The designation references only the footprint of Heritage Hall and not the entire SAIT campus.

Residence
SAIT Residence has two modern high rises located in the northeast corner of its main campus.

Campus Centre
The Campus Centre contained a coffee house, bar, Jugo Juice, gymnasium, fitness centre, squash courts, bowling alley, hockey arena, salt water pool and theatre. This building has been decommissioned, and demolition is currently in progress. Construction of a new Campus Centre is expected to be complete by 2025.

Stan Grad Centre
This central building on SAIT's main campus houses food service outlets, study areas, classrooms, the campus bookstore and the library.

Additional buildings on campus 

 Clayton Carroll Automotive Centre
 Aldred Centre
 John Ware building
 E.H. Crandell building
 Cenovus Energy Centre
 Johnson-Cobbe Energy Centre
 Senator Burns building
 Eugene Coste building
 Thomas Riley building

Athletics
SAIT has been a member of the Alberta Colleges Athletic Conference since 1964. The SAIT Trojans are represented basketball, curling, soccer, cross country running, hockey and volleyball.  All of SAIT's sports teams share the name Trojans.

Recognition
In 2021, SAIT's School of Business was one of three Canadian schools to make the top 100 of CEOWORLD Magazine's Best Business Schools in the World for 2021, SAIT ranked #52 overall.

In 2021, CEOWORLD Magazine recognized SAIT as the number one hospitality school in Canada on its list of the world's Best Hospitality and Hotel Management Schools, ranking #19 overall. CEOWORLD also ranked the School of Hospitality and Tourism as Canada's number one culinary school in its inaugural ranking of the Best Culinary Schools in Canada.

Notable alumni

Robert Alford, politician
Ken Allred, politician
Evan Berger, politician
Ted Godwin, artist and Officer of the Order of Canada
Jason Hale, politician
Laureen Harper, spouse of the former Prime Minister of Canada, Stephen Harper
Doug Horner, politician
Chris Jamieson, hockey player
David Joseph, basketball coach and former college player
Roy Kiyooka, artist and Officer of the Order of Canada
Greg Kolodziejzyk, cyclist
Paul Landry, polar explorer
Aylmer Liesemer, politician
Colin Low, filmmaker
Shane Lust, hockey player
Barry McFarland, politician
Noah Miller, water polo player and coach
Caia Morstad, volleyball player
Jackson Proskow, television newsperson
Jonathan Scott, co-host of Property Brothers
Jeremy St. Louis, television newsperson
J. D. Watt, hockey player
Len Webber, politician
Stewart Woodman, restaurateur

Arms

See also
Education in Alberta
List of universities and colleges in Alberta
Canadian Interuniversity Sport
Canadian government scientific research organizations
Canadian industrial research and development organizations
Canadian university scientific research organizations

References

External links

 (Federal Historic Sites and Monuments Act Designation)
 - (Provincial Historical Resources Act Designation)

 
Universities and colleges in Calgary
Colleges in Alberta
Vocational education in Canada
Educational institutions established in 1916
1916 establishments in Alberta
National Historic Sites in Alberta
Buildings and structures on the National Historic Sites of Canada register